Sivagami is a 1960 Indian Tamil-language drama film produced by Muthiah Pictures and directed by Antony Mitradas. It featured M. K. Thyagaraja Bhagavathar in his final film appearance alongside G. Varalakshmi playing the titular character. The film is a posthumous release for Bhagavathar.

Plot

Cast 
M. K. Thyagaraja Bhagavathar as Thyagaraja Bhagavathar (Himself)
G. Varalakshmi as Sivagami / Thyagaraja Bhagavathar's wife
S. D. Subbulakshmi as Muthu's mother
Jaggayya as Muthu / Thyagaraja Bhagavathar's step son
T. P. Muthulakshmi as Thangam
K. K. Soundar as Thangappan / Muthu's uncle
S. Rama Rao as Annasamy / Muthu's friend
Sivasooriyan as Muthu's uncle
Jayashree as Vasantha
Lakshmi Prabha
Natarajan

Production 
The film was produced by M. A. Venu under the banner Muthiah Pictures. By the year 1959, M. K. T. Bhagavathar requested M. A. Venu to produce a film. M. A. Venu agreed and started producing this film. However, M. K. T. Bhagavathar died while the production was half way. So, the crew adapted the story and completed the film. Bhagavathar could not sing at this time. He told the producer that he has some songs recorded earlier for another film Rajayogi that was never produced and told the producer to use those songs. Bhagavathar wore sunglasses in many scenes due to his then fading eyesight.

Soundtrack 
The soundtrack album was composed by K. V. Mahadevan. Lyrics by Papanasam Sivan and Ka. Mu. Sheriff.

References

External links 
 

1960 films
1960s Tamil-language films
Films directed by Antony Mitradas
Films scored by K. V. Mahadevan